Arthur Vincent Green (12 May 1857 – 24 September 1944) was an Anglican bishop in the late 19th and early 20th centuries, who founded two theological colleges.

He was born in Albury, Surrey on 12 May 1857 and educated at Trinity College, Melbourne.  He was ordained in 1880 and his first posts were  curacies at St Andrew's Church, Brighton, and St Peter's, Eastern Hill, Melbourne. He then  held incumbencies at  Holy Trinity, Maldon and St Paul's, Geelong. His next post was as Archdeacon of Ballarat.  In 1894 he was ordained to the episcopate as the Bishop of Grafton and Armidale. In 1898 he founded St John's College, Armidale and was the first Warden. 

In 1900 he was translated to Ballarat. In 1903 he founded St Aidan's Theological College and made a start on work on Christ Church Cathedral. He retired as bishop in 1915. From 1920 he was a lecturer in theology at his old college. 

His sister Florence paid for the education of a young Henry Handel Richardson; in Richardson's coming of age novel The Getting of Wisdom Florence was depicted as Miss Isabella, and Arthur as her brother, the Rev Mr Shepherd. Another sister, Agnes, was a religious in the Community of St. Denys in Warminster.

He died on 24 September 1944, aged 87.

Notes

1857 births
People from the Borough of Guildford
University of Melbourne alumni
Anglican bishops of Grafton and Armidale
Anglican bishops of Ballarat
Anglican archdeacons in Australia
20th-century Anglican bishops in Australia
People educated at Trinity College (University of Melbourne)
1944 deaths
Archdeacons of Ballarat